Collins Makgaka (born 28 June 1996) is a South African soccer player who plays as a midfielder for South African Premier Division side Orlando Pirates.

Career
Magkaka was born in Marble Hall.

After 5 years at Baroka, he left the club in the summer of 2020 after his contract was not renewed.

He joined Orlando Pirates on a three-year deal in September 2020.

References

Living people
1996 births
South African soccer players
People from Ephraim Mogale Local Municipality
Soccer players from Limpopo
Association football midfielders
Baroka F.C. players
Orlando Pirates F.C. players
South African Premier Division players
National First Division players